Plan 75 is a 2022 Japanese drama film directed by , starring Chieko Baisho, Hayato Isomura and Stefanie Arianne.

Cast
 Chieko Baisho as Mishi Kakutani
 Hayato Isomura as Himoru Okabe
 Stefanie Arianne as Maria
 Yuumi Kawai as Yoko Narimiya
  as Yukio Okabe
  as Ineko
  as Fujimaru
 
 Yoko Yano as Mishi's co-worker
  as Mishi's co-worker

Release
The film premiered at the Un Certain Regard section of the 75th annual Cannes Film Festival on 20 May 2022. The film also won the Special Mention award in the Caméra d'Or competition. The film was released in Japan on 17 June. The film was selected as the Japanese entry for the Best International Feature Film at the 95th Academy Awards.

Film distributor TBA Studios had acquired the theatrical distribution rights film in the Philippines, one of the co-producing countries for this film.

Reception
Diego Semerene of Slant Magazine rated the film 3 stars out of 4 and wrote that "With stinging precision, Hayakawa Chie reveals a culture that seems almost mobilized to destroy its own soul." Stephanie Bunbury of Deadline Hollywood wrote that "Stylistically, it looks a bit like a training film. What this means – the brilliance of this film – is that Hayakawa is able to make the idea of wiping out a generation seem drably normal within about quarter of an hour, something to ponder in itself." Tim Grierson of Screen Daily wrote that the film "may seem like it’s about ageing, but more accurately it is about the importance of community".

James Hadfield of The Japan Times rated the film 4 stars out of 5 and wrote that "as the film progresses, a sense of numb resignation sets in. But Hayakawa refuses to end on a resolutely downbeat note — and in its haunting closing shot, “Plan 75” achieves something close to an epiphany." Clarence Tsui of the South China Morning Post also rated the film 4 stars out of 5 and wrote that "throughout the film, Hayakawa implies rather than explains, and this tactfulness instils Plan 75 with the power one expects of a bitter denunciation for our troubling times." Jaden S. Thompson of The Harvard Crimson also rated the film 4 stars out of 5, writing that it "upholds the inherent value of human life with its introspective writing and performances."

Accolades

See also
 List of submissions to the 95th Academy Awards for Best International Feature Film
 List of Japanese submissions for the Academy Award for Best International Feature Film

References

External links
 
 

Japanese drama films
2022 drama films
2022 films